Max von Bock und Polach (5 September 1842 – 4 March 1915) was a Prussian officer and Field Marshal. He served in the military during the three wars of German unification under the leadership of Prime Minister Otto von Bismarck.

Early life
Max came from the Meissen Uradelsgeschlecht von Bock und Polach and was the second son of the Prussian captain Ernst von Bock und Polach (1799-1849). His older brother was the future Lord Mayor of Mülheim an der Ruhr, Karl von Bock und Polach (1840-1902).

Military career
After visiting the Cadet Corps, Bock und Polach joined the military, along with his brother Karl, in 1860, as a second lieutenant in Infantry Regiment No. 55 a. In 1864 he fought in the German-Danish War of 1866. During the Franco-German War, he served as adjutant of the Lieutenant-General Adolf von Glümer, a Member of Staff of the 13th Division and was awarded the Iron Cross II Class.

He was promoted to the rank of captain. He returned from the war and taught at the War College in Hanover. Shortly afterwards, he was transferred to Infantry Regiment No. 16. In 1872 he became à la suite of the 6th Westphalian Infantry Regiment "Graf Bülow of Dennewitz" No. 55.

Von Bock und Polach became a Major General in 1890. He returned a year later as a member of the Upper Military Study Commission and quartermaster in the Great General Staff. With his promotion to lieutenant general in 1893, he was appointed commander of the 20th Division in Hanover. Von Bock und Polach was then promoted to general of infantry in 1897, the Commanding General of the Guard Corps.

He led the XIV Army Corps in Karlsruhe from January 27, 1902 to September 10, 1907. In 1907 he became inspector general of the III Army inspection in Hanover. On September 18, 1908, he was appointed Colonel-General. Together with Alfred von Schlieffen and Colmar von der Goltz, he was appointed Field marshal by the Emperor at the New Year celebration on January 1, 1911.

In the fall of 1912, he submitted his resignation, which was granted with effect from September 13, 1912.

Family
Von Bock und Polach married on April 19, 1873, in Mehrum House, Mathilde Baroness von Plettenberg (1850-1924). They had three daughters.

Honours
German orders and decorations

Foreign orders and decorations

References

1842 births
1915 deaths
Prussian military personnel of the Second Schleswig War
German military personnel of the Franco-Prussian War
Field marshals of Prussia
Recipients of the Iron Cross (1870), 2nd class
Grand Crosses of the Military Merit Order (Bavaria)
Knights Grand Cross of the Order of Saints Maurice and Lazarus
Grand Cordons of the Order of the Rising Sun
Knights Grand Cross of the Order of Orange-Nassau